GCM may refer to:

Science and technology
 Galois/Counter Mode, in cryptography
 General circulation model, or global climate model
 Google Cloud Messaging
 Greatest common measure
 Ground continuity monitor

Other uses
 Owen Roberts International Airport, Grand Cayman, Cayman Islands
 GCM Resources, a British mining company
 Global Campaign for Microbicides
 Global Compact for Migration, a proposed international treaty
 Good Conduct Medal (United States), a military award
 Grand Central Madison, a commuter rail terminal set to open in late 2022
 Grand Corps Malade (born 1977), French slam poet
 Grand Cross of the Order of Merit (Portugal)
 Knight Grand Cross Royal Order of Monisaraphon, post-nominal letters
 Great Commission Ministries, an American Christian evangelistic organization
 Great Central Mines, a defunct Australian mining company
 Gross combination mass
 Claremore Regional Airport, in Oklahoma
 Genesis Climber MOSPEADA, a Japanese animated TV series